Stefan Svensson (born 17 February 1962) is a former professional tennis player from Sweden.

Biography
Svensson was born in Gothenburg but based in Kungälv.

A leading junior in Sweden, he won both European and national championships at various age levels. In 1979 he was a member of the Swedish team that finished runners-up to the United States in the Sunshine Cup. He also made the semi-finals of the boys' singles that year at the Orange Bowl and 1979 Wimbledon Championships.

Specialising in doubles, Svensson played professionally in the 1980s and won a total of five Challenger titles. During his career he featured in the men's doubles events at the Australian Open, French Open and Wimbledon Championships. He made Grand Prix doubles semi-finals in Linz in 1979, Båstad in 1980, Sofia in 1980, Nice in 1981 and Tel Aviv in 1986. In singles, he had a win over West German Davis Cup player Damir Keretić in the first round of a Grand Prix tournament in Barcelona.

He has worked for many years as a coach with the Swedish Tennis Association.

Challenger titles

Doubles: (5)

References

External links
 
 

1962 births
Living people
Swedish male tennis players
People from Kungälv Municipality
Sportspeople from Västra Götaland County